Fluorine perchlorate, also called perchloryl hypofluorite is the rarely encountered chemical compound of fluorine, chlorine, and oxygen with the chemical formula  or . It is an extremely unstable gas that explodes spontaneously and has a penetrating odor.

Synthesis 

One synthesis uses fluorine and perchloric acid, though the action of ClF5 on water is another method.

F2 + HClO4 -> FClO4 + HF

Another method of synthesis involves the thermal decomposition of tetrafluoroammonium perchlorate, which yields very pure  that may be manipulated and frozen without explosions.

NF4ClO4 ->[\ \Delta\ ] NF3{} + FClO4

Structure 

Fluorine perchlorate is not analogous to perchloric acid because the fluorine atom does not exist as a positive ion. It contains an oxygen atom in a rare oxidation state of 0 due to the electronegativity of oxygen, which is higher than that of chlorine but lower than that of fluorine.

Safety 

FClO4 has a very dangerous and unpredictable series of reactions associated with it, as a covalent perchlorate (chlorine in the +7 oxidation state) and a compound featuring a very sensitive O-F single bond. Small amounts of reducing agent, such as organic compounds, can trigger explosive detonation. Products of these decomposition reactions could include oxygen halides, interhalogen compounds, and other hazardous substances.

Accidental synthesis is possible if precursors are carelessly mixed. Like similar covalent fluorides and perchlorates, it needs to be handled with extreme caution.

Reaction 
FClO4 is a strong oxidant and it reacts with iodide ion:

FOClO3 + 2I^- -> ClO4^- + F^- + I2

FClO4 can also react with tetrafluoroethylene:

CF2=CF2 + FOClO3 -> CF3CF2OClO3

It may be a radical addition reaction.

References

External links

Chemist Derek Lowe's experiences with perchlorates

Explosive chemicals
Perchlorates
Oxidizing agents
Hypofluorites
Explosive gases